The Pacific Station was created in 1837 as one of the geographical military formations into which the Royal Navy divided its worldwide responsibilities. The South America Station was split into the Pacific Station and the South East Coast of America Station.

History

The British Pacific Squadron was established in 1813 to support British interests along the eastern shores of the Pacific Ocean at Valparaíso, Chile. In 1837, when the South America station was split, this responsibility was passed to the Commander-in-Chief, Pacific. King Kamehameha III capitulated and signed the islands over to Paulet. On 31 July 1843, Thomas assured the King that the occupation was over and that there was no British claim over the islands.

In 1842,  was sent north to survey the coast of Vancouver Island and what would become the Esquimalt Royal Navy Dockyard. During the survey trip, the crew of Pandora found that Esquimalt Harbour had a size and depth suited for use as a Royal Navy harbour. As tensions between Britain and America rose during the Oregon boundary dispute a base at the southern end of Vancouver Island would help strengthen the British claim to all of the island. The Oregon Treaty of 1846 ceded control over all of the island to Britain. In 1848,  was sent to Esquimalt and was the first vessel to be stationed there. In late August, the combined fleets sailed to Russia to engage in the Siege of Petropavlovsk, during which Rear Admiral David Price, the Commander-in-Chief, died. Captain Frederick William Erskine Nicolson of Pique was brevetted and took command of the British naval forces from 31 August 1854 until the arrival of the next Commander-in-Chief. In 1855, three "Crimean huts" were built at Esquimalt to serve as a hospital intended to receive wounded from the Crimean War. The huts were the first shore establishment at Esquimalt.

The presence of forests full of straight grained conifers such as the Coast Douglas fir meant that Vancouver Island could provide shipbuilding material suitable for spar making in the age of sail. The later discovery of coal on the island and at Vancouver's Coal Harbour, meant that the area could also serve as a useful resource in the age of steam as well. Rear-Admiral Robert Lambert Baynes, aware of the political importance of maintaining British sovereignty amidst the San Juan Boundary Dispute and the British Columbia gold rushes recommended to the Admiralty a move of the station headquarters from Valparaíso to Esquimalt in November 1859.

By 1865, Esquimalt was recognized as the base headquarters of the Pacific Station. The move from Valparaíso to Esquimalt helped the Pacific Station avoid involvement in the Chincha Islands War (1864–1866) between Spain, Chile, and Peru. Rear-Admiral de Horsey ordered  commanded by Frederick Bedford, against the Nicolás de Piérola-led Huáscar in the Battle of Pacocha on 29 May 1877. In that battle, Shah fired two Whitehead torpedoes at Huáscar, but they missed their mark and Huáscar got away.

A graving dock large enough to accommodate the largest ships in the Pacific fleet was commissioned at Esquimalt in 1887. After a period of relaxing tensions meant that British interests in British Columbia were secured, the Station was maintained to counter Russian ambitions in the Pacific. The Station was also crucial in defending British Columbia from the United States in the Alaska Boundary Dispute, during the contemporaneous 1898 Spanish–American War, when the US threatened to forcibly invade and annex British Columbia if its demands over Alaska were not met.

By the end of the 19th century, improved communications, the signing of the Anglo-Japanese Alliance and the need to concentrate warships in British waters to counter the developing German High Seas Fleet, meant that the station was closed down at sunset on 1 March 1905. Esquimalt Royal Navy Dockyard was transferred to the Canadian Department of Marine and Fisheries. The Pacific Station's responsibilities were divided between the China, Australia and the North America and West Indies Stations (the latter of which would also become responsible for the western South Atlantic, becoming the America and West Indies station after the First World War, with its Bermuda-based cruisers regularly cruising through the Panama Canal and up the western coast of North America to visit Esquimalt and other locations on the Pacific Coast of Canada).

After passage of the Naval Service Act in 1910, there was a Canadian Naval Service that controlled the base at Esquimalt and that service became the Royal Canadian Navy in 1911. In the 1960s, the amalgamation of defence services in Canada led to its re-constitution as Canadian Forces Base Esquimalt that includes HMC Dockyard.

Commanders-in-Chief, Pacific
Most commanders-in-chief of the station held the rank of rear admiral, with the exceptions of Hamond and Hastings who were each promoted to vice admiral before being reassigned to other duties, and Goodrich who was a commodore.

Legacy

The largest remnant of the Pacific Station is the CFB Esquimalt naval base in western Canada. Many geographical features of Vancouver Island and British Columbia are named after captains, commanders, and ships assigned to the Pacific Station. The Arco Británico triumphal arch in Valparaíso was constructed to commemorate the British presence in the city, including several Naval commanders. Thomas Square in Honolulu is named after Admiral Richard Darton Thomas. Although Union Flags were flown over Hawaii as early as 1816, the current state flag of Hawaii design dates from the close of the Paulet Affair and features a British Union Flag in its canton to commemorate the help that Thomas rendered the Kingdom of Hawaii.

Charles Darwin's visits to Valparaíso, Cerro La Campana, and the Galápagos Islands led to publication of The Voyage of the Beagle which, along with later works such as On the Origin of Species, helped to establish the field of evolutionary biology.

See also
 British Pacific Fleet – a World War II era fleet assembled to fight Japan
 China Station – a Royal Navy command that patrolled the Western Pacific Ocean in the 19th and 20th centuries
 Pacific Squadron – a division of the United States Navy between 1821 and 1907
 North America and West Indies Station

References

Further reading
 

 

Commands of the Royal Navy
History of Vancouver Island
Military history of Chile
1826 establishments in the British Empire
Military units and formations established in 1826